Ariel Winter Workman (born January 28, 1998) is an American actress. She starred as Alex Dunphy in the ABC comedy series Modern Family, for which she and her co-stars won four consecutive Screen Actors Guild Awards for Outstanding Ensemble in a Comedy Series. She also voiced the titular character in the Disney Junior show Sofia the First and Penny Peterson in the 2014 animated film Mr. Peabody and Sherman.

Early life 
Winter was born on January 28, 1998, the daughter of Chrisoula (née Batistas) and Glenn Workman. Through her mother, she is of Greek descent, and through her father, of German descent. She is the younger sister of actors Shanelle Workman and Jimmy Workman.

Career 
Winter obtained her first entertainment industry job in a Cool Whip commercial advertisement in 2002 when she was four years old. She had her first television role in an episode of Listen Up!, and followed it with appearances in a variety of shows such as Freddie, Monk, Bones, and ER.

In the animated children's show Phineas and Ferb, she voiced the character of Gretchen before winning the regular role of Alex Dunphy in the series Modern Family, which premiered in 2009 and ended in 2020. She has continued to work in TV animation, including providing the voice of Marina the Mermaid on Disney Junior's Jake and the Never Land Pirates. In 2012, Winter was cast as Sofia, the lead character in a then-new Disney animated franchise Sofia the First. The series premiered in January 2013 on Disney Junior. 
In 2014, she voiced Penny Peterson, Sherman's adversary turned friend in the DreamWorks Animation film Mr. Peabody and Sherman. She also lent her voice to characters in the animated films, Disney's Bambi II and Blue Sky's Ice Age: The Meltdown.

Winter has appeared in feature films, most notably in Kiss Kiss Bang Bang, Speed Racer, Duress, and Opposite Day. She also appeared on the Halloween-themed TV film Fred 2: Night of the Living Fred. For her leading role in the film The Chaperone, she was nominated at the Young Artist Awards 2012 as "Best Actress in a Motion Picture".

Personal life 
In October 2012, Winter's sister Shanelle Workman filed to become her guardian, alleging that their mother had been physically and emotionally abusive. On May 5, 2014, the court awarded guardianship to Workman and permanently removed Winter from her mother's guardianship. Their mother later released a statement saying that "the family has moved beyond the conflict". On May 15, 2015, when she was 17 years old, Winter declared on Twitter that she was officially emancipated.

In June 2015, Winter underwent breast reduction surgery. In a 2016 interview with ABC News Nightline, Winter explained the awkwardness of developing at 12 years old in the public eye, combined with the back pain that rendered her unable to stand up straight at times, was "really ostracizing and excruciatingly painful." Describing the improvement that the surgery had on her both physically and psychologically, she told Glamour magazine that  it was "amazing to finally feel right. This is how I was supposed to be." At the January 2016 Screen Actors Guild Awards, Winter gained media attention for wearing a Romona Kaveza gown that revealed her surgical scars. She was shocked after walking down the red carpet to see the photos the next day and "every headline be about my cleavage and -- not about my talent." Winter later tweeted: "Guys there is a reason I didn't make an effort to cover up my scars! They are part of me and I'm not ashamed of them at all."

Winter attended Campbell Hall School in Los Angeles, graduating in June 2016. In April 2016, she was accepted to University of California, Los Angeles (UCLA) and scheduled to begin there in the fall quarter of 2016. However, on September 12, she confirmed that she planned to attend UCLA in fall 2017. On her decision to attend college, she explained, "You gotta have something else you can do. I've always been interested in law, so I think it'll definitely be something that I'll love to do and also go to school for." In 2018, Winter took an indefinite hiatus from UCLA to focus on her work. In April 2019, she attended the We Day event in Tacoma, Washington.

Winter is a member of the Greek Orthodox Church.

Filmography

Film

Television

Video games

Awards and nominations

Screen Actors Guild Awards

Young Artist Awards

References

External links 

 
 
 
 

1998 births
Living people
21st-century American actresses
American child actresses
American film actresses
American television actresses
American people of German descent
American people of Greek descent
American video game actresses
American voice actresses
Greek Orthodox Christians from the United States